The American Cavy Breeders Association (ACBA) is considered a specialty club under the America Rabbit Breeders Association (ARBA).  Like many other specialty clubs under ARBA, the ACBA maintains a membership, awards sweepstakes points, provides special awards, publishes a newsletter and contributes to developing new standards.  Some may consider the ACBA to have greater responsibilities than other specialty clubs under ARBA because it is the only specialty club for cavies (Guinea Pigs) and supports all currently recognized breeds, whereas most of the other ARBA specialty clubs are devoted to a single rabbit breed.

The official acceptance of breeds and varieties, the requirement for permanent earmarking and other show requirements are regulated by ARBA.

References 

Animal welfare organizations based in the United States